
Gmina Mrozy is an urban-rural gmina (administrative district) in Mińsk County, Masovian Voivodeship, in east-central Poland.

Villages
Gmina Mrozy contains the villages and settlements of Borki, Choszcze, Dąbrowa, Dębowce, Gójszcz, Grodzisk, Guzew, Jeruzal, Kołacz, Kruki, Kuflew, Lipiny, Lubomin, Łukówiec, Mała Wieś, Mrozy, Natolin, Płomieniec, Porzewnica, Rudka, Skruda, Sokolnik, Topór, Trojanów, Wola Paprotnia and Wola Rafałowska.

Neighbouring gminas
Gmina Mrozy is bordered by the gminas of Cegłów, Kałuszyn, Kotuń, Latowicz and Wodynie.

References

Polish official population figures 2006

Mrozy
Mińsk County